5th TFCA Awards
December 20, 2001

Best Film: 
 Memento 
The 5th Toronto Film Critics Association Awards, honoring the best in film for 2001, were held on 20 December 2001.

Winners 
 Best Actor:
 Ed Harris – Pollock
Runners-Up: John Cameron Mitchell – Hedwig and the Angry Inch and Jack Nicholson – The Pledge
 Best Actress:
 Thora Birch – Ghost World
Runners-Up: Gillian Anderson – The House of Mirth and Tilda Swinton – The Deep End
 Best Canadian Film:
 Last Wedding
Runners-Up: Ginger Snaps and The Uncles
 Best Director:
 David Lynch – Mulholland Dr.
Runners-Up: Jean-Pierre Jeunet – Amélie and Peter Jackson – The Lord of the Rings: The Fellowship of the Ring
 Best Film:
 Memento
Runners-Up: Amélie and Mulholland Dr.
 Best First Feature:
 Sexy Beast
Runners-Up: Amores Perros and In the Bedroom
 Best Screenplay:
 Memento – Christopher Nolan
Runners-Up: Ghost World – Terry Zwigoff and Daniel Clowes and The Royal Tenenbaums – Wes Anderson and Owen Wilson
 Best Supporting Actor:
 Ben Kingsley – Sexy Beast
Runners-Up: Steve Buscemi – Ghost World and Ian McKellen – The Lord of the Rings: The Fellowship of the Ring
 Best Supporting Actress:
 Scarlett Johansson – Ghost World
Runners-Up: Laura Linney – The House of Mirth and Gwyneth Paltrow – The Royal Tenenbaums
 Clyde Gilmour Award:
 James Quandt

References 

2001
2001 film awards
2001 in Toronto
2001 in Canadian cinema